Uroš Milutinović (23 October 1962 – 27 April 2015) was a Serbian footballer who played as a forward for FK Partizan and FC La Chaux-de-Fonds.

References

1962 births
2015 deaths
Serbian footballers
Association football forwards
FK Partizan players
FC La Chaux-de-Fonds players
Serbian expatriate footballers
Serbian expatriate sportspeople in Switzerland
Expatriate footballers in Switzerland